Ronan Collins (born 9 October 1952) is an Irish broadcaster from Glasnevin, Dublin. Up until 23 December 2022, Collins held the prestige of maintaining one of the longest-running radio shows on Ireland’s national station, RTÉ Radio 1. At its peak, 250,000 listeners tuned in daily to ‘The Ronan Collins Show’ between 12pm - 1pm, Monday - Friday.

Life and career
Collins started his show business career as a member of a showband playing drums.

He began his national radio career on RTÉ Radio 2, having worked on pirate radio prior to that. During his television career, he presented the celebrity game show Play the Game from 1984 to 1995. He also used to present Ireland’s national lottery draw, and most recently A Little Bit Showband (2008–2009).

Collins has commentated on the Eurovision Song Contest for RTÉ One television.

He was a presenter as part of RTE's 1992 Barcelona Olympics coverage, shaving off his moustache when Ireland won a medal.

Ronan Collins left his daily lunchtime show at the end of 2022, to be replaced by Louise Duffy. He now presents a regular music show The Collins Collection on bank holidays and will present shows for RTÉ Gold.

Collins has been married to Woody since 1978, they have three children. In 2012, Collins was diagnosed with type 2 diabetes.

Controversies
Collins once had a memorably famous row with Louis Walsh on Liveline. Collins described Six's debut single "There's a Whole Lot of Loving Going On" as "absolutely awful" and "lacking in credibility, imagination and musicianship". Walsh called Collins "a failed showband star" who played in "Mickey Mouse bands" and told him to "go and save the kids around the world".

References

External links
 Website of The Ronan Collins Show

1952 births
Living people
Television personalities from Dublin (city)
RTÉ 2fm presenters
RTÉ Radio 1 presenters
RTÉ television presenters
People educated at St. Vincent's C.B.S., Glasnevin